Škoda Varsovia is an electric multiple unit train type developed by Škoda Transportation and operated by the Warsaw Metro. The production of the trains was launched in 2019. The first unit entered regular passenger service in 2022.

History 
In 2019, Škoda Transportation, a company based in Plzeň, Czech Republic, was awarded with a contract worth 1,308 billion Polish złoty for 37 trainsets, each with six cars. The 222 cars—including 74 driver and 148 passenger cars—were to be delivered to the Warsaw Metro, where they would be used on the extended M2 route and also ultimately replace the old Metrovagonmash cars on the M1 line.

Many suppliers from Poland participated in the car development and production. The aluminum cabins were welded and varnished in the Škoda Vagonka factory in Ostrava, Czech Republic, and the final assembly and testing took place in Plzeň. The contract also included the preparation of a simulator training programme, as well as an extended warranty and spare parts. The first car set was presented in December 2021, on the company test track in Plzeň.

In February 2021, the sets began testing at the Velim railway test circuit in Cerhenice, Czech Republic. The first train, designated with number 77, was delivered to Warsaw on 25 April 2022. This marked the beginning of the three-month period of homologation testing. The test were conducted at the Kabaty technical and parking station. Another train, designated with number 76, was delivered to Warsaw at the end of May 2022. On the night from 24 to 25 May 2022, the first test run without passengers took place on the M1, from the Kabaty technical and parking station to the Stokłosy metro station and back. In the following nights, more driving tests were conducted, and the length of the route was extended to the city centre. These tests checked the track compatibility, and communication and security systems.

On 19 August 2022, Škoda Transportation applied for a certificate of the acceptance of the trains into service and, after completing the documentation, received it from the Railway Transportation Office on 28 September 2022 for a fixed period.

The first day of public service was on 28 October 2022. On that day, unit number 78 left the Kabaty depot at 10:30 and arrived at the Kabaty metro station at 10:38 from where it proceeded to carry passengers across the M1 line. The next day, on 29 October 2022, the trains also begun being used on the M2 line. The Warsaw Metro also declared the possibility of donating the old Metrovagonmash 81-717/81-714 cars to the Kyiv Metro.

Characteristics 

The car length is 20 m, its width, 2.71 m, and height, 3.665 m. The height of the floor above the top of the rail is 1.14 m. The length of a six-car set is 119.01 m. The train voltage is 750 volts of direct current via the third rail. The maximum speed of the set is 90 km/h, and its acceleration is 1.2 m/s2, and deceleration is 1.3 m/s2, or 1.4 m/s2 during the emergency braking. The minimal arc radius is 70 m. The maximal axle load is 125 kN.

The cars are made from aluminium. A six-car long set includes 230 seats, including 2 disability seats, and can carry 1,500 passengers. Each car has 41 seats, except the car with driver's cabin, which has 33 seats.

Notes

References 

Electric multiple units of the Czech Republic
Train-related introductions in 2022
Warsaw Metro
Škoda locomotives